Boris Davidovich Razinsky (12 July 1933 — 6 August 2012) was a Soviet Russian Olympic champion football player and manager.

Personal life
Razinsky was born in Lyubertsy, Russia, and died in Moscow. He was Jewish. In 2009, Razinsky attended the 2009 Maccabiah Games to watch his grandson participate in the under-18 football competition. Razinsky's visit was marred by a brawl between the Russian and Argentine sides and both squads were told not to return for the 2013 Maccabiah Games.

Football career
Razinsky played both as a goalkeeper and as a striker (usually keeping one specific position while playing at the same club). He played in goal for the national team as a backup to Lev Yashin. His club from 1954 to 1961 was CSKA Moskva, with whom he earned three bronzes at the Soviet championships in 1955, 1956, and 1958, and the Soviet Cup in 1955.

International career
Razinsky made his debut for USSR on October 23, 1955, in a friendly against France.

He and the national team won the gold medal at the 1956 Olympics.

Honours 
 Olympic champion: 1956.
 Soviet Top League winner: 1953.
 Soviet Cup winner: 1955.

See also
List of select Jewish football (association; soccer) players

Footnotes

External links
Profile 
Boris Razinsky's obituary 

1933 births
People from Lyubertsy
2012 deaths
Soviet footballers
Soviet Union international footballers
Olympic footballers of the Soviet Union
Olympic gold medalists for the Soviet Union
Footballers at the 1956 Summer Olympics
Soviet football managers
Russian football managers
Soviet Top League players
FC Spartak Moscow players
PFC CSKA Moscow players
FC Dynamo Kyiv players
FC Chornomorets Odesa players
Daugava Rīga players
FC Ararat Yerevan players
FC Chernomorets Novorossiysk managers
Russian Premier League managers
FC Volgar Astrakhan managers
Olympic medalists in football
Soviet Jews
Jewish footballers
Russian Jews
Medalists at the 1956 Summer Olympics
Association football goalkeepers
Association football forwards
FC Volga Nizhny Novgorod players
FC Metallurg Lipetsk players
Sportspeople from Moscow Oblast